Barry J.C. Purves (born 28 August 1960) is an English animator, director and screenwriter of puppet animation television and cinema and theatre designer and director, primarily for the Altrincham Garrick Playhouse in Manchester.

Purves is a British animator who has made his six short films (see filmography below), each of which has been nominated for awards (including Academy Award and British Academy Film Awards nominations), he has also directed and animated for several television programs and over seventy advertisements, title sequences and animated insert sequences. His film credits include being head animator for Tim Burton's Mars Attacks! (before the decision was made to use computer animation in place of stop motion), previsualisation animation director for Peter Jackson's King Kong 

Purves' book 'Stop Motion: Passion, Process and Performance' was released through Focal Press in 2007. Around 1996 he made plans to shoot a full-length film of Noye's Fludde, Benjamin Britten's opera version of a mystery play about the Deluge; he was also credited with co-presenting, in Mandarin, the live final of the Chinese talent search show Super Girl in 2006.

A selection of his films, and those with animation by Ray Harryhausen, the bolexbrothers, Suzie Templeton and others, were included alongside those of Kihachirō Kawamoto himself in the Watershed Media Centre season Kawamoto: The Puppet Master in 2008.

Filmography
Next: The Infinite Variety Show (1989), a farce inspired by Shakespeare's plays in which William Shakespeare himself attempts to impress the twentieth-century theatre director Peter Hall, with music by Stuart Gordon of The Korgis, John Sheaff and Will Gregory of Goldfrapp.
Oh, Mr. Toad (1990), which was co-directed with Jackie Cockle and Chris Taylor.
Screen Play (1992), which recounts the Willow pattern story(relocated to Japan) in the style of East Asian physical theatre such as kabuki and Bunraku, narrated simultaneously in British Sign Language and English.
Rigoletto (1993), which is part of the Operavox series of half-hour animated versions of operas commissioned by S4C.
Achilles (1995), which recounts the story of Achilles and Patroclus in a style inspired by the theatre and sculpture of ancient Greece.
Gilbert & Sullivan: The Very Models (1998)
Hamilton Mattress (2001)
Rupert Bear, Follow the Magic... (2006)
Plume (2011)
Tchaikovsky (2011), an introduction to the composer's life and works.
 Toby's Travelling Circus (2012)

Availability
Screen Play is included on DVD-Video in British Animation Classics Volume One, published by the British Animation Awards.

A then-complete collection of Purves' short films, titled His Intimate Lives, is the first release from agnès b. DVD (a collaboration between the eponymous fashion designer and film producer with distributor Potemkine) and was released in France on 17 June 2008. The video presents each film at its intended aspect ratio but that of the widescreen Achilles, Gilbert and Sullivan and Hamilton Mattress is not anamorphic and, being released in 2008, the more recent Plume and Tchaikovsky are not included.

Notes

External links

 
Excerpt of Screenplay on Vimeo
Barry Purves on IMDB

British animated film directors
English animators
English film directors
English scenic designers
Aardman Animations people
English television directors
English theatre directors
English-language film directors
Living people
Mass media people from Manchester
Stop motion animators
1960 births